Le Courrier du Vietnam is the only French-language newspaper published in Vietnam. It was first established in 1964 in Hanoi and has since been the most circulated French language news medium in Vietnam and Southeast Asia.

Le Courrier du Vietnam also broadcasts French language and cultural programs (the latter usually in Vietnamese) weekly on VTV1, the primary news channel in Vietnam. The newspaper used to be daily but is currently weekly.

References

External links

Vietnam Media

1964 establishments in Vietnam
Newspapers published in Vietnam
Publications established in 1964
French-language newspapers published in Asia